The Classic 33 is an American sailboat that was designed by W. Shad Turner as a cruiser and first built in 1995.

The design is a development of the Laguna 33, using the same molds, which Classic Yachts acquired after Laguna Yachts went out of business.

Production
The design was built by Classic Yachts in Chanute, Kansas, United States, starting in 1995, but it is now out of production. It is not known how many were completed before Classic Yachts closed down in 2000.

Design
The Classic 33 is a recreational keelboat, built predominantly of fiberglass, with wood trim. It has a masthead sloop rig, a raked stem, a reverse transom, an internally mounted spade-type rudder controlled by a wheel and a fixed fin keel. It displaces  and carries  of ballast.

See also
List of sailing boat types

References

Keelboats
1990s sailboat type designs
Sailing yachts
Sailboat type designs by W. Shad Turner
Sailboat types built by Classic Yachts